The Ace Horana Power Station was a  thermal power station in Horana, Sri Lanka. The plant operated from 2002-2012 similar to that of the Ace Matara Power Station, and utilized four   generating units. The plant was decommissioned in 2012 after its 10-year PPA expired. The power station was originally planned to be built in Anuradhapura, but was later changed to Horana due to environmental and religious protests.

Participants in the debt component were HNB (US$ 5.00 m), Commercial Bank (US$ 2.00 m), People's Bank (US$ 1.50 m), Bank of Ceylon (US$ 1.25 m), HSBC (US$ 1.25 m), Pan Asia Bank (US$ 0.50 m), and DFCC Bank (Rs. 178 million). The project was developed by Aitken Spence (51%), CDC Group (29%), Wärtsilä (10%) and Banaras House India (10%).

See also 
 Embilipitiya Power Station
 Ace Matara Power Station
 List of power stations in Sri Lanka

References

External links 
 

Oil-fired power stations in Sri Lanka
Buildings and structures in Horana
Former power stations in Sri Lanka